Pachycormiformes is an extinct order of marine ray-finned fish known from the Early Jurassic to the end of the Cretaceous. It only includes a single family, Pachycormidae. They were characterized by having serrated pectoral fins (though more recent studies demonstrated that fin shape diversity in this group was high), reduced pelvic fins and a bony rostrum. Their exact relations with other fish are unclear, but they are generally considered to be teleosteomorphs, more closely related to teleosts than to Holostei. Pachycormiformes are morphologically diverse, containing both tuna and swordfish-like carnivorous forms, as well as edentulous suspension-feeding forms, with the latter including the largest ray-finned fish known to have existed, Leedsichthys, with an estimated maximum length of 16 metres.

Synapomorphies 

Pachycormiformes are united by "a compound bone (rostrodermethmoid) forming the anterodorsal border of the mouth; a reduced coronoid process of the mandible; absence of supraorbitals associated with a dermosphenotic defining the dorsal margin of the orbit; two large, plate-like suborbital bones posterior to the infraorbitals; long, slender pectoral fins;  asymmetrical branching of pectoral fin lepidotrichia; considerable overlap of the hypurals by caudal fin rays (hypurostegy); and the presence of distinctive uroneural-like ossifications of the caudal fin endoskeleton".

Relationships 
Pachycormiformes are generally interpreted as members of Teleosteomorpha, the group that includes all fish more closely related to modern teleosts than to Holostei (the group containing bowfin and gars), often they have been considered to be the sister group of the Aspidorhynchiformes.

Gallery

Taxonomy 
Taxonomy according to Cooper et al. (2022):

 Euthynotus Wagner, 1860
 Haasichthys Delsate, 1999
 Notodectes Dolgopol de Saez, 1949
 Pseudoasthenocormus 
 Sauropsis Agassiz, 1843
 Hypsocorminae Vetter, 1881
 Australopachycormus Kear, 2007
 Hypsocormus Wagner, 1860
 Kaykay Gouiric-Cavalli & Arratia, 2022
 Orthocormus Weitzel, 1930
 Protosphyraena Leidy, 1857
 Simocormus Maxwell et al., 2020
 Asthenocorminae Cooper et al., 2022
 Germanostomus Cooper et al., 2022
 Ohmdenia Hauff, 1953
 Pachycormus? Agassiz, 1833
 Saurostomus Agassiz, 1843
 Suspension-feeding clade
 Asthenocormus Woodward, 1895
 Bonnerichthys Friedman et al., 2010
 Leedsichthys Woodward, 1889
 Martillichthys Liston, 2008
 Rhinconichthys Friedman et al., 2010

Cladistics according to Friedman et al. (2010).

References

 
Late Triassic first appearances
Maastrichtian extinctions
Prehistoric ray-finned fish orders